The term lepton from the Greek λεπτός (meaning "small") may refer to:
Lepton, one of the two classes of fermionic (matter) particles
Greek lepton, a small denomination of currency in Greece
Lepton, West Yorkshire, England
Lepton (album), a composition by Charles Wuorinen
Lepton image compression format, a computer file signature